The Roman Catholic Diocese of Ruyigi is a diocese located in the city of Ruyigi in the Ecclesiastical province of Gitega in Burundi.

History
 April 13, 1973: Established as Diocese of Ruyigi from the Metropolitan Archdiocese of Gitega and Diocese of Ngozi

Bishops
 Bishops of Ruyigi (Roman rite), in reverse chronological order
 Bishop Blaise Nzeyimana (since October 30, 2010)
 Bishop Joseph Nduhirubusa (April 19, 1980  – October 30, 2010)
 Bishop Joachim Ruhuna (April 13, 1973  – March 28, 1980), appointed Coadjutor Archbishop of Gitega

Other priest of this diocese who became bishop
Joachim Ntahondereye, appointed Bishop of Muyinga in 2002

See also
Roman Catholicism in Burundi

References

External links
 GCatholic.org
 Catholic Hierarchy 

Ruyigi
Ruyigi
Ruyigi
Roman Catholic dioceses and prelatures established in the 20th century